The women's daoshu / gunshu all-around competition at the 2008 Beijing Wushu Tournament was held on August 21 at the Olympic Sports Center Gymnasium.

Background 
The favorite of the competition was Jade Xu (then known as Xu Huihui). At the 2007 World Wushu Championships, Xu became a three-time world champion. Geng Xiaoling was another projected favorite, as she won a silver medal in daoshu and a bronze medal in changquan at the 2007 world championships which was also her international debut. Another projected favorite could have been Macau's Xi Cheng Qing who won the gunshu and changquan silver medals at the 2007 world championships, but she decided to compete in the changquan event for this competition and won silver.

Although Xu was ranked first in the gunshu event, Geng was able to achieve a superior performance for daoshu and won the competition.

Schedule 
All times are Beijing Time (UTC+08:00)

Results 
Both events were judged without the degree of difficulty component.

References 

Women's_daoshu_and_gunshu